Goiswintha or Goisuintha was Visigothic Queen consort of Hispania and Septimania. She was the wife of two Kings, Athanagild and Liuvigild. From her first marriage, she was the mother of two daughters — Brunhilda and Galswintha — who were married to two Merovingian brother-kings: Sigebert I of Austrasia and Chilperic, king of the Neustrian Franks. 

Following the death of her first husband Athanagild in 567, she became the second wife of Liuvigild, the brother of Athangild's successor Liuva I. Shortly thereafter Liuvigild became king of the Visigoths, and Goiswintha became Queen consort once more, and stepmother to her husband's sons Hermenegild and Reccared I. 

Goiswintha was an influential personality in the royal court. In 579, her stepson Hermenegild married her granddaughter Ingund, daughter of Goiswintha's daughter Brunhilda by the Frankish king Sigebert I. As Queen, it fell to Goiswintha to welcome the young bride to court, and reportedly Goiswintha was at first very kind to the young princess. However, she was determined that Ingund should be re-baptized in the Arian faith. Ingund, still only twelve, firmly refused. According to Gregory of Tours: "the Queen lost her temper completely" and "seized the girl by her hair and threw her to the ground: then she kicked her until she was covered with blood, had her stripped naked and ordered her to be thrown into the baptismal pool". Whether because of this fracas, or, more likely, because of Leovigild's desire to assure the succession of his sons (consistent with his previous actions to associate his sons with himself as rulers of the kingdom), he sent Hermenegild and Ingund to Seville to rule a portion of his kingdom - presumably the province of Baetica and southern Lusitania. There, Hermenegild was influenced by his wife and Leander of Seville to convert to Chalcedonian Christianity, and to rebel against the king. He would eventually be defeated, and executed by the King in 585.

Following Liuvigild's death in 586, his younger son Reccared became king. He promptly converted to Catholicism. In the later part of 588 a conspiracy against him was headed by queen dowager Goiswintha together with the Arian bishop Uldila, but they were detected, and the bishop was banished.

References 

Visigothic queens consort
Year of birth unknown
6th-century people of the Visigothic Kingdom
6th-century women